James Tuttle (born 13 May 1996) is an Australian rugby union player. He is currently contracted to the Melbourne Rebels after previously playing for the Queensland Reds.

Tuttle attended St Joseph's College, Nudgee and represented Queensland and Australia at schoolboy rugby in 2013. He joined Queensland club side GPS, and his performances in the Queensland Premier Rugby competition led to his signing with the Queensland Country team for the inaugural season of the National Rugby Championship (NRC) in 2014.

In 2015, Tuttle was selected for the Australia Under-20 team to play at the World Rugby Under 20 Championship in Italy. He signed a three-year Super Rugby contract with the Brisbane-based Reds in 2015, and toured with the team to South Africa but did not play. After Queensland Country's captain Anthony Fainga'a was forced to withdraw from the 2015 NRC season due to injury, Tuttle was appointed as the new captain of the side.

Tuttle currently studies a Bachelor of Commerce at Deakin University.

In 2022, Tuttle was selected in the Australia ‘A’ Rugby Union Team to play at the Pacific Nations Cup in Fiji. Later that year he toured again with Australia ‘A’ to Japan to play the Japan XV side in a three-match series. Tuttle was appointed as captain for the team’s final match in Osaka.

Super Rugby statistics

References

External links
 It's Rugby stats

1996 births
Living people
Australian rugby union players
Rugby union scrum-halves
Rugby union fly-halves
Rugby union players from Brisbane
Queensland Country (NRC team) players
Queensland Reds players
Melbourne Rebels players